Albert, Duke of Bavaria may refer to:

Albert I, Duke of Bavaria (1336–1404), count of Holland, Hainaut, and Zeeland
Albert II, Duke of Bavaria (1368–1397), count of Holland, Hainaut, and Zeeland
Albert III, Duke of Bavaria (1401–1460)
Albert IV, Duke of Bavaria (1447–1508)
Albert V, Duke of Bavaria (1528–1579)
Albert VI, Duke of Bavaria (1584–1666)
Albrecht, Duke of Bavaria (1905–1996)